Robbins's tateril (Taterillus arenarius), or the Sahel gerbil, is a species of rodent found across Mauritania and possibly Mali and Niger. Its natural habitats are dry savanna and subtropical or tropical dry shrubland.

References

Robbins's tateril
Mammals of West Africa
Sahel
Robbins's tateril
Taxonomy articles created by Polbot